"El Perdón" is a song by American singer Nicky Jam and Spanish singer Enrique Iglesias released as the first single to Nicky Jam's fourth studio album Fénix (2017). An English-language version of the song, titled "Forgiveness", was released on 10 July 2015. The single was later included on Enrique Iglesias' eleventh studio album Final (2021).

Background 
"El Perdón" was initially a solo track by Nicky Jam. After talking with Jam, Spanish singer Enrique Iglesias decided to collaborate with him to release a single. Iglesias told Billboard that even though he usually writes or co-writes the songs he sings on, he didn't provide songwriting on the track. The song quickly rose to the top of the charts and became a huge success. The music video was recorded in Medellin, Colombia.

Reception

Critical 
Billboard ranked "El Perdón" at number 12 on its year-end list: "So much has been said about records set by "El Perdón," the second longest-running number-one song on the Billboard Hot Latin Songs chart. But too little has been said about the mix of sweet and sad on the danceable tune. Not to mention those plaintive lyrics of lost love that can make girls (and guys) cry. "When I wrote the beginning of the song—'Did he take you to the moon, and I couldn't do that'—that part hit me really hard," Nicky Jam told Billboard. Trust us, Nicky, we get it, too."

"El Perdón" won a Latin Grammy Award, for it hit number-one in over 40 countries around the world, achieving over four million sales and 300 million streams worldwide.

Commercial 
"El Perdón" became an international hit. The song reached number one on the Billboard Hot Latin Songs within five weeks, and spent 30 weeks at the top spot, bypassing Shakira's "La Tortura" (25 weeks), and behind Iglesias' own song "Bailando" (41 weeks). The song reached the summit on multiple Billboard Latin charts, including Latin Airplay, Latin Digital Sales, Latin Streaming Songs, and Latin Pop Songs. Nicky Jam and Iglesias released an English version of the track titled "Forgiveness". The release, with strong first week digital sales, brought the single to reach number 56 on the Billboard Hot 100.

The single had staying power, logging 30 weeks on the Hot 100, becoming the longest-charting song not to make the top 50. "El Perdón" ranked number 96 on the Billboard year-end top 100, becoming the lowest-peaking song to make the year-end chart (a record which would later be broken by "Talk You Out of It" by Florida Georgia Line which peaked at 57 in 2019). The English version, "Forgiveness",  made an impact on Mainstream Top 40 and Rhythmic Top 40 stations in the US, peaking at number 29 in total audience for Mainstream Top 40 according to Mediabase. On 1 September 2015, the video for "Forgiveness", directed by Jessy Terrero, debuted on Jam's channel on YouTube, and has more than 45 million views. The Spanish version of the "El Perdón" music video has over 1.3 billion views, and the lyric video counts over 450 million views. The single also peaked at number one in Spain, France, Italy and Netherlands and charted in the top five in Switzerland and Belgium. In the Netherlands, Iglesias scored his first number-one hit with "El Perdón", after having previously scored four top two hits ("Could I Have This Kiss Forever", "Hero", "Do You Know" and "Can You Hear Me") in that country. The song spent six weeks at number one in France and was certified diamond in the nation and Poland for sales of 500,000 and 100,000 respectively.

Charts

Weekly charts

Year-end charts

Decade-end charts

All-time charts

Certifications

Awards and nominations

See also 
 List of number-one Billboard Hot Latin Songs of 2015
 List of number-one singles of 2015 (Spain)

References

2015 singles
Enrique Iglesias songs
Spanish-language songs
2015 songs
Number-one singles in Spain
Male vocal duets
Nicky Jam songs
Songs written by Nicky Jam
Sony Music Latin singles
Number-one singles in Italy
Dutch Top 40 number-one singles
Number-one singles in Poland
Number-one singles in Switzerland
Ultratop 50 Singles (Wallonia) number-one singles
Latin Grammy Award for Best Urban Fusion/Performance